Myfanwy (a woman's name derived ) is a popular Welsh song, composed by Joseph Parry and first published in 1875.

Background 
Sources differ as to whether Dr. Parry composed the music for an existing poem by Richard Davies ("Mynyddog Mwynfawr"; 1833–1877) (the common belief) or whether Davies wrote the words to Parry's melody following its use with an English lyric by Thomas Walter Price (Cuhelyn; 1829 - 1869)(*1), journalist and poet, called "Arabella".

Richard Davies' lyric may have been influenced by the 14th Century love story of Myfanwy Fychan of Castell Dinas Brân, Llangollen, and the poet Hywel ab Einion(*2). That story was also the subject of the popular poem, "Myfanwy Fychan" (1858), by John Ceiriog Hughes (1832–87). Some sources say it was written with Parry's childhood sweetheart, Myfanwy Llywellyn, in mind (*3). In 1947, Merthyr-Tydfil-born author Jack Jones wrote a book entitled Off to Philadelphia in the morning where he relates the story within some aspects of the life of Parry, weaving facts into his fictional narrative (*4).

Lyrics and Translation

Usage and Performances 
A hundred years after it was first published Ryan Davies performed the song at the Swansea Top Rank introducing it as "the greatest love song ever written". A live recording of this version was included on Davies' album Ryan at the Rank and quickly became one Davies' most notable and familiar performances.

Davies' rendition began a renewed popularity for the performance of the song, especially with Welsh Male Voice Choirs. Two of the most widely recognized choral renditions are by the Treorchy Male Voice Choir,and the Neath Male Voice Choir. The song is often performed at the Principality Stadium during the Welsh rugby team's home matches, and the Morriston Orpheus Choir recorded a version of the song for the Welsh Rugby Unions official album in 2006.

John Cale has performed the song throughout his career, most notably a 1992 TV performance on the S4C programme Heno. Opera singer, Bryn Terfel recorded a choral version of the song on his album "We'll Keep a Welcome". Cerys Matthews recorded a guitar version for her 2010 album Tir,

In popular culture
The song features in John Ford's Academy Award-winning film How Green Was My Valley and also in the last scene of the Swansea-based movie Twin Town, where it is sung by members of many local choirs, including the Pontarddulais Male Choir. At a key moment of the plot, the protagonist in the 1992 Welsh-language film Hedd Wyn, which was nominated for an Academy Award, sings it to his former fiancée.

It is both played and discussed in the episode "Death and Dust" of the show Midsomer Murders, during a visit to Wales by detectives from an English village.

Myfanwy Thomas is the main character in Daniel O'Malley's The Rook.

In Torchwood, the pterodactyl that is kept by the Torchwood team as a pet is called Myfanwy.

References

External links

 Midi rendition 
 Trelawnyd Men's Choir Performs "Myfanwy"
 Morriston Orpheus Choir Performs "Myfanwy"
 Myfanwy - Neath Choir (Welsh-English Lyrics)
 Mal Buck at Tonyrefail Workingmen's Club

Compositions by Joseph Parry
Welsh folk songs
1875 songs
Welsh patriotic songs